= ADIME =

ADIME, or Assessment, Diagnosis, Intervention, and Monitoring/Evaluation, is a process used to ensure high quality nutrition care to patients and clients from nutrition professionals, such as Registered Dietitians (RD) or Registered Dietitian Nutritionist (RDN). ADIME is used as a means of charting patient progress and to encourage a universal language amongst nutrition professionals.

== Steps ==
The ADIME process consists of four steps:

- Assessment — This step involves collecting data pertinent to the patient, including nutrition-related History, anthropometric Measurements, biochemical data, nutrition-focused physical findings, client history and comparative standards.
- Diagnosis — Based on the assessment data collected, a nutrition problem may be diagnosed. Causes and contributing factors are identified.
- Intervention — Based on the nutrition diagnosis, problems are addressed that aid in alleviation of the diagnosis’ signs and symptoms. Activities are constructed to enable the patient to work towards objectives set for them by themselves and their nutrition professional.
- Monitoring/Evaluation — Progress made on goals and/or expected outcomes is tracked to ensure that nutrition problems are being addressed; adjustments in the Intervention step are made according to progress.
